The Prince-Bishopric of Eichstätt (German: Hochstift Eichstätt, Fürtsbistum Eichstätt, Bistum Eichstätt) was a small ecclesiastical principality of the Holy Roman Empire. Centered on the town of Eichstätt, it was located in the present-day state of Bavaria, somewhat to the west of Regensburg, to the north of Neuburg an der Donau and Ingolstadt, to the south of Nuremberg, and to the southeast of Ansbach.

Geography

Geographically, the territory of the Prince-Bishopric was very fragmented and, as of 1789, consisted of one main part to the east that was bordered by Bavaria in the north, east, and south, and by Pappenheim and Brandenburg-Ansbach in the west. The rest of the principality was located to the west and consisted of several fragments of various sizes enclaved mostly within Brandenburg-Ansbach. The total area was about 1100 km2, with a population of 58,000 (as of 1855).

History
The Diocese of Eichstätt was established in 741, when the Anglo-Saxon missionary Willibald was consecrated to the episcopate by Saint Boniface and turned to the church of Eichstätt in the German stem duchy of Bavaria. His successors achieved the status of a Prince-Bishop, when they inherited the Franconian territories of their former Vogt officials, the extinct Counts of Hirschberg (at Hirschberg Castle in the present-day town of Beilngries). In reaction to the Protestant Reformation, Eichstätt joined the Catholic League in 1617. The lands of the bishopric were a centre of the Counter-Reformation and the site of numerous witchcraft trials.

In the course of the 1802 German mediatization  following the French Revolutionary Wars, the bishopric was secularized and was in 1803, along with the Archbishopric of Salzburg, given in compensation to Archduke Ferdinand of Habsburg-Lorraine, brother of Emperor Francis II and former Grand Duke of Tuscany.  Three years later, following Austria's defeat by Napoleon at the Battle of Austerlitz, the area was given to the Kingdom of Bavaria according to the Treaty of Pressburg. From 1817 to 1855, the Principality was recreated as a fief of Bavaria for the benefit of Napoleon's stepson Eugène de Beauharnais.

See also
List of Bishops of Eichstätt
Roman Catholic Diocese of Eichstätt

References

Sources
  Eichstätt in Meyers Konversationslexikon, 1888
 

745 establishments
Former states and territories of Bavaria
Prince-bishoprics of the Holy Roman Empire in Germany
Roman Catholic dioceses in the Holy Roman Empire
Franconian Circle
8th-century establishments in Germany
Eichstätt